Jenő Szűcs (July 13, 1928 in Debrecen – November 24, 1988 in Leányfalu) was a Hungarian historian who focused on the regions and development of Europe and how the regions of East and West both subsequently affected each other to their modern form.

References 

1928 births
1988 deaths
20th-century Hungarian historians
1988 suicides
Suicides in Hungary